Bilbao is a station on Line 1 and Line 4 of the Madrid Metro. It is located in Zone A.

History 
The station opened in 1919 on Line 1 and is one of the first eight stations on the network between Cuatro Caminos and Sol. The Line 4 station opened in 1944 on the first section on the line between Argüelles and Goya.

Following nearly two years of extensive construction works, the station reopened in July 2020, now equipped with a total of seven elevators and updated wall linings.

References 

Line 1 (Madrid Metro) stations
Line 4 (Madrid Metro) stations
Railway stations in Spain opened in 1919